Fischeria is a genus of flies in the family Tachinidae.

Species
 Fischeria bicolor Robineau-Desvoidy, 1830

References

Tachinidae
Insects of China